Arthur Veary Treacher (23 July 1894 – 14 December 1975) was an English film and stage actor active from the 1920s to the 1960s, and known for playing English types, especially butler and manservant roles, such as the P.G. Wodehouse valet character Jeeves (Thank You, Jeeves, 1936) and the kind butlers opposite Shirley Temple in Curly Top (1935) and Heidi (1937). In the 1960s, he became well known on American television as an announcer/sidekick to talk show host Merv Griffin, and as the support character Constable Jones in Disney's Mary Poppins (1964).  He lent his name to the Arthur Treacher's Fish and Chips chain of restaurants.

Personal life
Treacher was the son of Arthur Veary Treacher (1862–1924), a Sussex solicitor; his mother was Alice Mary Longhurst (1865–1946).  He was educated at a boarding school in Uppingham in Rutland. In 1936, he married Virginia Taylor (1898–1984).

Acting career
Treacher was a veteran of World War I, serving as an officer of the Royal Garrison Artillery; his father had served with the Sussex Volunteer Artillery before Treacher's birth. After the war, he established an acting career in England, and in March 1926 went to New York as part of a musical-comedy revue named Great Temptations. He was featured in the 1930 Billy Rose musical revue Sweet and Low.

He began his movie career during the 1930s, which included roles in four Shirley Temple movies: Curly Top (1935), Stowaway (1936), Heidi (1937), and The Little Princess (1939). Scenes intentionally had the 6' 4" Treacher standing or dancing side by side with the tiny child actress; for example, in The Little Princess they sing and dance together to an old song "Knocked 'em in the Old Kent Road".

Treacher filled the role of the ideal butler, and he portrayed P. G. Wodehouse's valet character Jeeves in the movies Thank You, Jeeves! (1936) and Step Lively, Jeeves (1937). (Wodehouse, however, was unhappy with the way his work had been adapted, and refused to authorize any further Jeeves movies.)  Treacher played a valet or butler in several other movies, including Personal Maid's Secret, Mister Cinderella, and Bordertown.  He was caricatured in the 1941 cartoon Hollywood Steps Out.

Treacher also did radio programs in the 1940s and early 1950s, most notably as a waiter on Duffy's Tavern.

Later years
During 1961 and 1962, he and William Gaxton appeared in Guy Lombardo's production of the musical revue Paradise Island, which played at the Jones Beach Marine Theater. In 1962, he replaced Robert Coote as King Pellinore (with over-the-title name billing) in the original Broadway production of Lerner and Loewe's musical play Camelot, and he remained with the show through the Chicago engagement and post-Broadway tour that ended during August 1964.

From the mid-1950s on, Treacher became a familiar figure on American television as a guest on talk shows and panel games, including The Tonight Show and The Garry Moore Show.  In early 1961, Treacher appeared in episode 463 of the TV game show I've Got a Secret in which he rode a horse on stage.  In 1964, Treacher was cast in the role of Constable Jones in the hugely successful Walt Disney movie Mary Poppins.  That same year, he played the role of stuffy English butler Arthur Pinckney in two episodes of The Beverly Hillbillies. Pinckney mistakenly believed the hillbillies were the domestic servants of the family by whom he was hired, while the hillbillies believed Pinckney was a boarder at their Beverly Hills mansion.

He became even better known to American television audiences when talk-show host Merv Griffin made him announcer and occasional bantering partner on  The Merv Griffin Show from 1965 to 1970 ("...and now, here's the dear boy himself, Merrr-vyn!"). In 1966 Treacher and Merv Griffin recorded an album together under the soubriquet 'Alf & 'Alf entitled Songs of the British Music Hall. When in 1969 Griffin switched from  syndication to the CBS network, network executives insisted that Treacher was too old for the show, but Griffin fought to keep Treacher and eventually won. However, when Griffin relocated his show from New York to Los Angeles the next year, Treacher stayed behind, telling Griffin "at my age, I don't want to move, especially to someplace that shakes!"

During this period of latter-day popularity, Treacher capitalised on his name recognition through the use of his name and image for such franchised business concerns as the Call Arthur Treacher Service System (a household help agency) and Arthur Treacher's Fish and Chips. The restaurants became very popular during the 1970s and increased to nearly 900 outlets, although in interviews Treacher would refuse to confirm or deny that he had any ownership stake in the company. (Only one free-standing Arthur Treacher's was still in existence by 2022, located in Cuyahoga Falls, Ohio. Several attached Arthur Treacher's franchise locations are still operating out of Salvatore's Pizzeria locations in Rochester NY and one continues to operate out of the Twin Oaks Convenience Store in Pomeroy, Ohio).

Treacher died at the age of 81 due to cardiovascular disease.

Filmography

 The Battle of Paris (1929)Harry
 Fashions of 1934 (1934)The Duchess' Butler (uncredited)
 Gambling Lady (1934)Pryor (uncredited)
 Riptide (1934)Reporter (uncredited)
 Viva Villa! (1934)English Reporter (scenes deleted)
 Hollywood Party (1934)Durante's Butler (uncredited)
 The Key (1934)Lt. Merriman, Furlong's Aide
 Here Comes the Groom (1934)Butler
 Madame Du Barry (1934)Andre, Master of the Bedroom
 Student Tour (1934)British Radio Announcer (uncredited)
 Desirable (1934)Butler (uncredited)
 The Captain Hates the Sea (1934)Major Warringforth
 Forsaking All Others (1934)JohnsonDill's Butler (uncredited)
 Bordertown (1935)RobertsElwell's Butler (uncredited)
 David Copperfield (1935)Donkey Man (uncredited)
 The Winning Ticket (1935)Horse Race Announcer (uncredited)
 The Woman in Red (1935)Major Albert Casserly (uncredited)
 Let's Live Tonight (1935)Ozzy Featherstone
 Cardinal Richelieu (1935)Agitator
 Go Into Your Dance (1935)Latimer (uncredited)
 The Nitwits (1935)Man with Tennis Equipment (uncredited)
 No More Ladies (1935)Lord Knowleton
 Going Highbrow (1935)Waiter
 The Daring Young Man (1935)Col. Baggott
 Curly Top (1935)Butler
 Bright Lights (1935)Wilbur
 Orchids to You (1935)Roger Morton
 I Live My Life (1935)Gallup, Mrs. Gage's Butler
 A Midsummer Night's Dream (1935)Epilogue
 Personal Maid's Secret (1935)Owen
 Remember Last Night? (1935)Phelps
 Splendor (1935)Major Ballinger
 Hitch Hike Lady (1935)Mortimer Wingate
 Magnificent Obsession (1935)Horace
 Anything Goes (1936)Sir Evelyn Oakleigh
 Hearts Divided (1936)Sir Harry
 Satan Met a Lady (1936)Anthony Travers
 The Case Against Mrs. Ames (1936)Griggsby
 Thank You, Jeeves! (1936)Jeeves
 Mr. Cinderella (1936)Watkins, Randolph's Butler
 Under Your Spell (1936)Botts
 Stowaway (1936)Atkins
 Step Lively, Jeeves! (1937)Jeeves
 Thin Ice (1937)Nottingham
 She Had to Eat (1937)Carter
 You Can't Have Everything (1937)Bevins
 Heidi (1937)Andrews
 Mad About Music (1938)Tripps
 My Lucky Star (1938)Whipple
 Always in Trouble (1938)Rogers
 Up the River (1938)Darby Randall
 The Little Princess (1939)Bertie Minchin
 Bridal Suite (1939)Lord Helfer
 Barricade (1939)Upton Ward
 Brother Rat and a Baby (1940)Snelling
 Irene (1940)Bretherton
 Star Spangled Rhythm (1942)'Sweater, Sarong & Peekaboo Bang' Number
 Forever and a Day (1943)Second Air Raid Watcher
 The Amazing Mrs. Holliday (1943)Henderson
 Chip Off the Old Block (1944)Quentin
 In Society (1944)Pipps
 National Velvet (1944)Race Patron
 Delightfully Dangerous (1945)Jeffers
 Swing Out, Sister (1945)Chumley
 That's the Spirit (1945)Masters
 Fun on a Weekend (1947)Benjamin O. Moffatt
 Slave Girl (1947)Thomas 'Liverpool' Griswold
 The Countess of Monte Cristo (1948)Hotel Managing Director
 That Midnight Kiss (1949)Hutchins
 Love That Brute (1950)Quentin, Hanley's Butler
 Mary Poppins (1964)Constable Jones
 Ready Player One (2018)digital avatar known as 'The Curator' for Ogden Morrow.

References

External links

 
 

1894 births
1975 deaths
20th-century English male actors
British Army personnel of World War I
British expatriate male actors in the United States
English male film actors
English male radio actors
English male television actors
English male stage actors
English television personalities
People from Brighton
Royal Garrison Artillery officers
Male actors from Sussex
People educated at Uppingham School